Catherine Linstrum is a writer and film director who now lives in Wales.

California Dreamin' (Endless), a film which she co-wrote, won the Un Certain Regard Award at the 2007 Cannes Film Festival, and Nadger (2010) won a BAFTA Cymru award for best Short Film in 2011.

Filmography 
Nuclear (2019) (writer/director)
Things That Fall from the Sky (2016) (writer/director)
Nadger (2010) (writer/director)
California Dreamin' (Endless) (2007) (writer)
Two Families (2007) (writer)
The Counting House (2006) (writer)
The Boy with Blue Eyes (2004) (writer/director)
Dreaming of Joseph Lees (1999) (writer)
The Black Dog (1999) (writer/director)

Television episodes 
Primeval (2009) - Episode 3.5 (writer)

Notes

External links

Living people
21st-century British women writers
British television writers
English-language film directors
British women television writers
Year of birth missing (living people)
21st-century British screenwriters